Nikoline Nielsen (born 3 October 1987) is a Danish left back handballer, playing for Slagelse FH.

Her clubs 
She became a league player, when she changed from the Danish 1st division club Lyngby HK in 2007 to GOG. When they merged with Odense hf to Odense GOG (becoming HC Odense) she continued there. Before Lyngby HK she played for Ålhom IF and Hillerød.

National team 
She began on the Danish national team on 16 October 2007, and as of 12 March 2011 she has played nine games and scored 11 goals. After being out in two years because of an injury, she was selected for the national team again in August 2010.

External links 
 Player stats, hcodense.dk 
 National team stats, Danish Handball Federation 
 Nikoline Nielsen back to national team, Danish Handball Federation 
 News from when she changed to GOG, fyens.dk 

Living people
1987 births
Danish female handball players